Ronald Hartley Waldman (13 May 1914 – 10 March 1978) was a British radio presenter and television executive for the BBC.

Biography
Born in London, he was the eldest son of Michael Waldman OBE JP, a sometime Mayor of Hackney, and was educated at Dame Alice Owen's School, Islington, and Pembroke College, Oxford.

Career
Waldman began his career as an actor and producer (1935–1938) before joining the BBC Variety department in 1938. Following wartime service in the Royal Air Force Volunteer Reserve, he became the assistant Head of Variety Productions in 1948.

The British public knew him best for his work with Harry S. Pepper as presenter of the popular Monday Night at Eight radio magazine programme, which was broadcast every week live.  The programme started in 1937 as "Monday Night at Seven", becoming "Monday Night at Eight" soon after the outbreak of the Second World War. It was broadcast throughout the war and continued for several years after it. Waldman's speciality was "Puzzle Corner", with a "deliberate mistake" which listeners were invited to spot in time for next week's show.  Each week saw a birthday guest star allowed four wishes, and one wish came true if it could be arranged.

After becoming a producer in Television Light Entertainment, in 1950 Waldman rose to be the BBC's Head of Light Entertainment. He launched many of distinguished names in light entertainment, such as Julie Andrews and Morecambe and Wise.

Waldman later served as the Business Manager of BBC Television Programmes (1958–1960), General Manager of BBC Television Enterprises (1960–1963), Managing Director of Visnews (1963–1977), President of the Lord's Taverners (1966) and as a trustee of the International Institute of Communications (1975–1978).

Personal life
His recreations included music and cricket. He died from cancer in March 1978, aged 63. He left a widow, the actress Lana Morris, whom he had married in 1953, and a son.

1914 births
1978 deaths
British television executives
British television producers
English male radio actors
People educated at Dame Alice Owen's School
English people of Jewish descent
Alumni of Pembroke College, Oxford
20th-century British male actors
Royal Air Force Volunteer Reserve personnel of World War II
BBC people
Deaths from cancer in the United Kingdom